Laméac is a commune in the Hautes-Pyrénées department in south-western France.

See also
Communes of the Hautes-Pyrénées department

External links
http://www.lameac.eu

References

Communes of Hautes-Pyrénées